Joseph Burt Wallace (28 December 1933 – 19 April 1993) was a Scottish professional footballer who made over 330 appearances in the Football League for Shrewsbury Town as a half back.

Wallace signed on for Shrewsbury Town after being stationed in the army in Shropshire at Donnington. After football he settled in Shrewsbury where he ran a pub and a fish and chip shop in the town at Coton Hill. He died there of cancer in 1993.

Career statistics

References 

1933 births
1993 deaths
Footballers from Glasgow
Scottish footballers
English Football League players
Association football wing halves
Royal Army Ordnance Corps soldiers
Shrewsbury Town F.C. players
Southport F.C. players
People from Dennistoun
20th-century British Army personnel